Costel Burțilă (born 14 July 1991) is a Romanian rugby union player. He plays as a prop for French Fédérale 1 club Hyères-Carqueiranne-La Crau.

Club career
Costel Burțilă played mostly of his career in French Fédérale 1 league system. His started his rugby career in France in 2012 with Stade Rodez Aveyron. In 2015 he was signed by Fédérale 1 club Cognac playing there for only a season. In 2016 followed a move to Lavaur where he played for two seasons and in 2018 he was signed by Fédérale 1 club Trélissac. After just one season with Trélissac he was signed Hyères-Carqueiranne-La Crau in 2019.

International career
Burțilă is also selected for Romania's national team, the Oaks, making his international debut during the Week 2 of 2020 Rugby Europe Championship in a test match against the Os Lobos.

References

External links

 Costel Burțilă at Hyères-Carqueiranne-La Crau website (in French)

1991 births
Living people
Romanian rugby union players
Romania international rugby union players
Rugby union props